The Tulsa Threat are one of two current women's tackle football teams in the state of Oklahoma. They began play during the 2011 season as the Tulsa Eagles. They are a member of the Women's Football Alliance, a nationally ranked 41-team women's football league that plays 11-on-11, NCAA rules football during the spring. Based in Tulsa, Oklahoma, the Threat plays in Tulsa at LaFortune Stadium on the campus of Memorial High School. In 2012, they produced 4 All-Americans and 5 All-Americans in 2013.

Season-By-Season

|-
| colspan="6" align="center" | Tulsa Eagles (WFA)
|-
|2011 || 0 || 8 || 0 || 3rd American Southeast || –
|-
| colspan="6" align="center" | Tulsa Threat (WFA)
|-
|2012 || 2 || 6 || 0 || 3rd WFA American 13 || –
|-
|2013 || 3 || 5 || 0 || 2nd WFA American 13 || –
|-
|2014* || 0 || 0 || 0 ||  || –
|- 
!Totals || 5 || 19 || 0
|colspan="2"| 

* = Current standing

2014

Current Season schedule

2011

Standings

Past Season Results

** = Forfeited

2012

Past Season Results

2013

Past Season Results

External links 
Tulsa Threat official website

Women's Football Alliance teams
Sports in Tulsa, Oklahoma
American football teams in Oklahoma
American football teams established in 2011
2011 establishments in Oklahoma
Women's sports in Oklahoma